The Search for the Snow Leopard is a Hardy Boys Digest novel, written by Franklin W. Dixon. It is the 139th volume in the Hardy Boys series of detective/adventure books and was published in 1996.

Plot summary
Frank and Joe, with their best bud Chet Morton, investigate when a princess's pet snow leopard goes missing from the Bayport Zoo. They become embroiled in a more dangerous case when the princess herself is kidnapped.

References

External links
The Search for the Snow Leopard at Fantastic Fiction

1996 American novels
1996 children's books
American children's books
The Hardy Boys books
English-language novels
Novels about cats
Fictional leopards